The 1984 Kilkenny Senior Hurling Championship was the 90th staging of the Kilkenny Senior Hurling Championship since its establishment by the Kilkenny County Board.

Ballyhale Shamrocks were the defending champions.

St. Martin's won the championship after a 1-14 to 1-07 defeat of Ballyhale Shamrocks in the final. It was their first ever championship title. It remains their only championship triumph.

References

Kilkenny Senior Hurling Championship
Kilkenny Senior Hurling Championship